The 1978 KFK competitions in Ukraine were part of the 1978 Soviet KFK competitions that were conducted in the Soviet Union. It was 14th season of the KFK in Ukraine since its introduction in 1964. The winner eventually qualified to the 1979 Soviet Second League.

First stage

Group 1

Group 2

Group 3

Group 4

Group 5

Group 6

Final

References

Ukrainian Football Amateur League seasons
KFK